Željko Ivanković (born August 29, 1954 in Vareš) is a Yugoslavian and Bosnian poet, novelist, short story writer, essayist, translator.

Recent activity 
In 2017, Željko Ivanković has signed the Declaration on the Common Language of the Croats, Serbs, Bosniaks and Montenegrins.

Works

Books 
 Nesto od onog što jest, Sarajevo, 1978 (poetry)
 Utrka puzeva, Sarajevo, 1982 (poetry)
 Vrijeme bez glagola, Sarajevo, 1986 (poetry)
 (D)ogledi, Tuzla, 1987 (studies, essays, literary criticism)
 Price o ljubavi i smrti, Banja Luka (short stories)
 Urusavanje slike, Sarajevo, 1990 (poetry)
 Zvjezdangrad, Sarajevo, 1990; Wuppertal, 1995; Sarajevo, 2000; Sarajevo-Wuppertal, 2005 (short stories for children)
 Dodirom i svijet poce, Sarajevo, 1992; Zagreb-Sarajevo, 2006 (novel)
 700 dana opsade, Zagreb, 1995 (war journal)
 Izgubljeni zavicaj, Ljubljana, 1995 (poetry)
 Ljubav u Berlinu, Zagreb, 1995; Sarajevo, 1995 (novel)
 Tko je upalio mrak?, Zagreb, 1995; Sarajevo, 2000 (short stories)
 (D)ogledi, II, Zenica, 1997 (essays)
 Trazenje zavicaja, Zagreb, 1997 (poetry)
 Izbor poezije, Sarajevo, 1999 (poetry)
 Pisci franjevci vareskog kraja, Split-Vareš, 1999 (essays)
 (D)ogledi, III, Mostar, 2000 (studies, essays, literary criticism)
 Nove price o ljubavi i smrti, Zagreb-Sarajevo, 2001 (short stories)
 Na marginama kaosa, Sarajevo, 2001 (essays)
 Raskos, hladna mjesecina, Zagreb, 2002 (poetry)
 Odrastanja, Sarajevo, 2002 (short stories for children)
 Vareske price, Vareš-Wuppertal, 2003 (short stories)
 Izbor prica hrvatskih pisaca za djecu u Bosni i Hercegovini, Sarajevo–Zagreb–Wuppertal, 2005.
 Izbor pjesama hrvatskih pisaca za djecu u Bosni i Hercegovini, Sarajevo–Zagreb–Wuppertal, 2005.
 Isus je procitao novine, Sarajevo, 2006 (poetry)
 Tetoviranje identiteta. Pohlepa za prošlošću (studije i eseji), Sarajevo, 2007 (essays)
 Dnevnik melankolije, Sarajevo, 2008. (poezija)
 Citati Ivankovica u Sarajevu, Sarajevo, 2010. (polemike)
 Na svoji baštini, Sarajevo, 2010. (priče)
 Pogled s margine, Mostar, 2011. (kolumne)

Translations 

 Mozart: Pisma ocu, Banja Luka, 1990., 1991., 2003.
 Price stare Kine, Sarajevo, 1991.
 Heinrich Böll: Potraga za citateljem, Sarajevo, 2001.
 G. A. Bürger: Pustolovine baruna Münchhausena, Sarajevo, 2003. (koautorstvo s Romanom Ivankovicem)
 Israel Zwi Kanner: Zidovske price, Zagreb – Sarajevo, 2007.
 Mozart: Pisma, Zagreb, 2007.
 Hans Küng: Izborena sloboda. Sjecanja, Rijeka – Sarajevo, 2009. (koautorstvo s Romanom Ivankovicem)

References

Further reading
 Mirko Marjanović, Leksikon hrvatskih književnika Bosne i Hercegovine od najstarijih vremena do danas, Matica hrvatska Sarajevo, HKD Napredak, Sarajevo, 2001.

1954 births
Living people
Bosnia and Herzegovina essayists
Bosnia and Herzegovina novelists
Bosnia and Herzegovina poets
Bosnia and Herzegovina writers
Croats of Bosnia and Herzegovina
People from Vareš
Signatories of the Declaration on the Common Language